John Rankin may refer to:

John Rankin (abolitionist) (1793–1886), American Presbyterian minister, educator and abolitionist
John Rankin (Canadian politician) (1820–?), represented Renfrew North in the 1st Canadian Parliament
John E. Rankin (1882–1960), United States Representative from Mississippi
John M. Rankin (1873–1947), Iowa state representative and attorney general
John W. Rankin, captain of the USS Phoenix cruiser at Pearl Harbor
John Walker Rankin (1823–1869), American politician
John Rankin (British politician) (1890–1973), Scottish Member of Parliament, 1955–1973
John Rankin (diplomat) (born 1957), British diplomat
John Morris Rankin (1959–2000), Canadian pianist and fiddler, member of The Rankin Family
John Rankin (footballer, born 1983), Scottish footballer with Ross County, Hibernian, Dundee United etc
John Rankin (1910s footballer),  Scottish footballer Third Lanark, Airdrieonians
Johnnie Rankin (1901–1952), Scottish footballer with Hamilton, Dundee, Charlton, Chelsea etc

See also
John Rankine (disambiguation) 
Jon Rankin